Lennox Gaehler (born 8 November 1951) is a South African politician who represented the United Democratic Movement in the National Assembly of South Africa. Gaehler is the national fundraising officer of the party.

References

Living people
United Democratic Movement (South Africa) politicians
Members of the National Assembly of South Africa
1951 births
Place of birth missing (living people)